Amrut is the name of a village in Kunduz Province in the Khinjan valley near the mouth of the Bajgah glen, about six miles east of Khinjan. It has earlier been inhabited by Koh-i-Gadi Hazaras.

See also
 Kunduz Province

References

Populated places in Kunduz Province